Johann Peter Heuschkel (4 January 1773 – 5 December 1853) was a German oboist, organist, music teacher and composer.

Heuschkel was born in Harras near Eisfeld.  From 1792 he was oboist and later also organist in Hildburghausen. He is best remembered for being the teacher of Carl Maria von Weber (1796). He also taught music to the children of Duke Frederic. In 1818 he became court music teacher at Biebrich, where in later years he taught his grandson Wilhelm Dilthey. As a composer, Heuschkel wrote mostly wind music, oboe concertos, piano sonatas, and songs.  He died, aged 80, in Biebrich.

References

External links
Biography at Verlag Dohr (German)

1773 births
1853 deaths
German composers
German classical oboists
Male oboists
German classical organists
German male organists
Male classical organists